Acanthocobitis (Paracanthocobitis) zonalternans also known as the dwarf zipper loach is a species of ray-finned fish in the genus, or subgenus, Paracanthocobitis. This species is known from Bangladesh, Myanmar, Thailand, and peninsular Malaysia. It is found in the Brahmaputra, Meghna, Irrawaddy, Sittang, Salween, Maeklong, and drainages in peninsular Thailand and Malaysia. The range extends from northern Myanmar to peninsular Malaysia. It is not known from the Chao Phraya basin.

References

zonalternans
Fish described in 1860
Taxa named by Edward Blyth